North Bass Island Airport  is a public airport located on North Bass Island, Ohio, United States. It is owned and operated by the Put In Bay Township Port Authority.

Facilities and aircraft 
For the 12-month period ending August 30, 2013, the airport had 1,000 aircraft operations, all are general aviation.

References

External links 
 Put In Bay Airport

Transportation in Ottawa County, Ohio
Airports in Ohio